Lawrence Lenihan is an American businessperson. Lenihan began his career at IBM, and became a principal at Broadview Associates. He is the co-founder of Pequot Ventures in 1996, FirstMark Capital in 2008, Norisol Ferrari in 2009, and Resonance in 2015. He has also served as an adjunct professor at New York University’s Leonard N. Stern School of Business, and has sat on boards for companies funded by his venture funds in addition to others.

Education
Lawrence Lenihan received his Bachelor of Science in electrical engineering from Duke University in 1987, He later received an MBA from the Wharton School of Business at the University of Pennsylvania.

Career
Lenihan began his career working for IBM as a sales associate, where he worked for six years and co-developed one of the company's first transactional interactive multimedia software kiosk products. He then moved his career to Broadview Associates for three years, where he was a senior member of the mergers and acquisition team and eventually became a principal at the firm. Then in 1996, Lenihan co-founded Pequot Ventures as a part of Pequot Capital Management and served as its managing director. The company was later spun off into the firm FirstMark Capital, which he also ran. He announced that he left the company in December 2015. Lenihan was the chair of the NYC Ventures Fellows Program and served as an advisor on Mayor Bloomberg's  Council on Technology and Innovation. Additionally he has been a judge for the Ernst & Young's National Entrepreneur of the Year Award, and chaired the selection committee for the E&Y Venture Capital Award. He also sits on the boards of Body Labs, TraceLink, and the Digital Currency Group.

Fashion industry
In 2009 Lenihan co-founded the women's apparel company Norisol Ferrari, his partner's eponymous label, and serves on its board as chair. Additionally he acquired Crouch & Fitzgerald, a company founded in 1839. In July 2015, Lenihan co-founded Resonance Companies LLC with Christian Gheorghe, and serves as the chairman of the board. Resonance is venture operating company that invests in and builds early-stage fashion companies. The first company backed by Resonance was Tucker by Gaby Basora and JC-RT was the second. Lenihan was also a member of the NYC Economic Development Fashion 2020 Advisory Board and has served as a panel judge for competitions held by the Council of Fashion Designers of America.

Teaching
Lenihan has taught classes on entrepreneurship as an adjunct professor at New York University’s Leonard N. Stern School of Business. In the past he has donated his salary as investment capital to businesses developed in his class, including funding the founders of Hublished. He is also co-founder and a board member of the NYU Stern Fashion Lab, was chairman of the Duke University Pratt School of Engineering Devil Venture Fund, and was a member of the Wharton Private Equity & Venture Capital Association Advisory Board.

References

Duke University Pratt School of Engineering alumni
Living people
Year of birth missing (living people)
Wharton School of the University of Pennsylvania alumni
American chief executives